
Gmina Czerwonak is a rural gmina (administrative district) in Poznań County, Greater Poland Voivodeship, in west-central Poland.

It includes Koziegłowy, which is Poland's second most populous village with 10,755 inhabitants (2006). Czerwonak itself has a population of 5,432. The gmina also contains the south-western part of the protected forest area Puszcza Zielonka Landscape Park, including the hill of Dziewicza Góra, which is the Park's highest point and has an observation tower (seasonally open to the public).

Villages
Gmina Czerwonak contains the villages of Annowo, Bolechówko, Bolechowo, Bolechowo-Osiedle, Czerwonak, Dębogóra, Kicin, Kliny, Koziegłowy, Ludwikowo, Miękowo, Mielno, Owińska, Potasze, Promnice, Szlachęcin and Trzaskowo.

Neighbouring gminas
Gmina Czerwonak is bordered by the city of Poznań to the south-west, and by the gminas of Swarzędz (south), Pobiedziska (south and east) Murowana Goślina (north and east), and Suchy Las (west).

References
Polish official population figures 2006

Czerwonak
Poznań County